Bobby Thompson (born August 2, 1937) is a former American football coach and college athletics administrator.  He served at the head football coach at Northwestern Oklahoma State University in 1974 and two stints as the head football coach at Fort Hays State University in Hays, Kansas, from 1979 to 1980 and again in 1984, compiling a career college football coaching record of 16–23–2.  He was the athletic director at Fort Hays State from 1980 to 1981, the University of South Dakota from 1981 to 1982, the University of Nebraska Omaha from 1985 to 1988, and University of Texas at San Antonio (USTA) from 1988 to 1999.

Thompson was born on August 2, 1937, in Guthrie, Oklahoma, and attended Guthrie High School there.  He played football and baseball at Eastern Oklahoma Junior College—now known as Eastern Oklahoma State College—in Wilburton, Oklahoma and at Adams State College—now known as Adams State University—in Alamosa, Colorado.

Head coaching record

College

References

1937 births
Living people
American football quarterbacks
Adams State Grizzlies baseball players
Adams State Grizzlies football players
Fort Hays State Tigers athletic directors
Fort Hays State Tigers football coaches
Idaho Vandals football coaches
Kansas State Wildcats football coaches
Nebraska–Omaha Mavericks football coaches
Northwestern Oklahoma State Rangers football coaches
Oklahoma State Cowboys football coaches
Omaha Mavericks athletic directors
South Dakota Coyotes athletic directors
UTSA Roadrunners athletic directors
West Texas A&M Buffaloes football coaches
High school football coaches in New Mexico
High school football coaches in Oklahoma
Junior college baseball players in the United States
Junior college football players in the United States
People from Guthrie, Oklahoma